, better known mononymously as Takuya (stylized in all caps as TAKUYA), is a Japanese musician, singer, songwriter and record producer. He was formerly the second guitarist of the Judy and Mary. He currently works as a solo artist under the name Takuya and also had a solo project called Robots which was dissolved in 2009. He was previously married to a former geisha from Gion, but they divorced in 2006. His most recent release was a duet with Aya Kamiki titled "W-B-X (W-Boiled Extreme)", the theme for Kamen Rider W.

Discography

Singles
As Robots

"Robot" (October 29, 1997)

"she-through" (May 13, 1998)
"Alchemist" (September 9, 1999)

"Jumping Jack" (November 3, 1999)
"Cloud Collector" (January 1, 2000)
Digital singles as Robots
"Greatest delight" (June 18, 2006)

"Zero" (December 24, 2008)

As Takuya
"I love you" (September 11, 2002)
"Hotaru" (October 23, 2002)
"Ai x Go! Yu x Go!" (January 18, 2012)

Collaboration
"WBX (W-Boiled Extreme)" (November 11, 2009)  (with Aya Kamiki)
"Over Again" (February 10, 2021) (with Aya Kamiki)

Albums
As Robots
Guitar de Pop (November 6, 1997)
Cloud Collector (November 3, 1999)
Dying Music (September 5, 2007)

As Takuya
The Wide Wild World (November 27, 2002)
54 it (read as "go for it") (September 1, 2004)

Music production
Saruganseki's "Hatsukoi" (Lyrics & composition as Takuya, arrangement as Robots)
Λucifer's "Seitenshi Blue" (Composition), "Silent Melody" (Composition), "Tokyo Illusion" (Composition), "Carnation Crime" (Composition), "Rinne no Hitomi" (Composition), "Tsubasa" (Composition), & "Hyper Sonic Soul" (Composition)
Juemilia's "Reset" (Lyrics with Yasushi Akimoto & Composition)
SMAP's "Susume!"
Hitomi Takahashi's "Komorebi" (Composition & Arrangement), "Candy Line" (Composition & Arrangement), "Jet Boy Jet Girl" (Composition & Arrangement), & "Tsuyoku Nare" (Composition & Arrangement)

See also
 An Music School

References

External links
  
Robots official website 
Universal Music profile 
Interview on ototoy 

1971 births
21st-century Japanese composers
21st-century Japanese guitarists
21st-century Japanese male musicians
Japanese composers
Japanese guitarists
Japanese male composers
Japanese record producers
Living people
Male guitarists
Musicians from Kyoto
Universal Music Japan artists